Zizeeria, commonly called grass blues, is a genus of butterflies in the family Lycaenidae, found in Africa and Asia.

Species
List of species classified under the genus:
 Zizeeria karsandra (Moore, 1865) – dark grass blue
 Zizeeria knysna (Trimen, 1862) – African grass blue, sooty blue

Notes
The following were previously included on this page but are not species in Zizeeria:
 Zizeeria antanossa Mabille, 1877. A species in Zizina Chapman, 1910.
 Zizeeria otis Fabricius, 1787. A species in Zizina Chapman, 1910.
 Zizeeria labradus Godart, 1823. A subspecies of Zizina otis Fabricius, 1787.
 Zizeeria ossa Swinhoe, 1885. A subspecies of Pseudozizeeria maha Kollar, [1844].

References

Polyommatini
Butterflies of Africa
Butterflies of Asia
Lycaenidae genera